Voronezh State University is one of the main universities in Central Russia, located in the city of Voronezh. The university was established in 1918 by professors evacuated from the University of Tartu in Estonia. The university has 18 faculties and an enrollment of 22,000 students from Russia, Europe, Africa, the Americas and Asia. Besides, the university has 6 research institutes and 16 research laboratories administered by the Russian Academy of Science. The university is composed of 10 buildings and 7 resident halls situated throughout the city. For over 90 years the University has trained more than 100,000 professionals.

History
In 1802 following a decree of Russian Emperor Alexander I the University of Tartu in Estonia was re-established. As a result of the German occupation of Estonia during World War I in March 1918, Russian students and professors had to leave the Estonian territory for their own safety. It was decided that a new university would be established in central Russia. In July and September 1918 from Dorpat (now Tartu),  39 professors, 45 lecturers, 43 staff and about 800 students arrived in Voronezh. The first rector of the university was Basil E. Regel.

On 12 November 1918 four faculties started working, namely the faculty of Medicine, the faculty of Physics and Mathematics, the faculty of History and Philology and the Law faculty. In the beginning of 1919, the University had an enrollment of 10,000 students. Anyone could study there, only 4 years later in 1923 that entrance exams were introduced. In 1920, after the Treaty of Tartu, the properties of the University of Tartu (libraries, archives, manuals, documents and other objects) were returned to Estonia. However, most of the teachers who have left due to the onset of the army of Imperial Germany and the occupation of Estonia, did not return to Estonia.

In the early 1920s,  Voronezh Institute of Education was added to the university, which marked the beginning of pedagogical faculties, departments that prepares teachers of mathematics, physics, chemistry, natural science, Russian language and literature, social and economic disciplines for schools. In 1930, the Medical Faculty was transformed into an independent institute. During World War II the university was relocated in Yelabuga in the Republic of Tatarstan for a period of two years from 1941 to 1943.

Faculties
Applied Mathematics, Informatics and Mechanics
Mathematics
Computer Sciences
Physics
Chemistry
Pharmaceutics
Biology and soil sciences
Economics
Geography, Geoecology & Tourism
Geology
History
Institute of International Education
International Relations
Journalism
Law
Philology
Philosophy and Psychology
Romance and Germanic Philology
Military education

Buildings and infrastructures

Voronezh State University has 10 academic buildings and 7 residence halls located primarily in the city centre. The university also administers Galichya Gora, a nature reserve open to staff and students for research and study.

Fundamental research

research centres 

Wave Processes in Inhomogeneous and Non-Linear Media ( Director: Prof. Aleksandr S. Sidorkin http://www.rec.vsu.ru/eng/)
Innovative Technologies (Director: Prof. Boris A. Zon )
Spacecraft and Rocket Engineering (Co-Director: Prof. Sergey A. Zapryagayev )
Radio Engineering and Electronics (Co-Director: Prof. Ivan I. Borisov )
Scientific and technological cooperation with the EU ( Director: Prof. Igor N. Zornikov )
Shared use of research equipment ( Director: Dr. Mikhail V. Lesovoy )
Technology Transfer ( Director: Dr. Igor V. Aristov )
Geography, Land use and Geo-ecology( Co-Director: Prof. Vladimir I. Fedotov )
Geology ( Co-Director: Prof. Sergey A. Zapryagayev )
Human ecology ( Co-Director: Prof. Semyon A. Kurolap )
Biology ("Venevitino")
Chemical Physics ( Co-Director: Prof. Ivan I. Borisov )

research laboratories 

Wave Processes (Co-Director: Prof. Boris A. Zon http://www.vsu.ru/english/depts/research/labs/waveproc.html )
X-ray Crystallography (Co-Director: Dr. Kseniya B. Aleynikova )
Electron Spectroscopy for Solid-State Physics (Academic Director: Prof. Evelina P.Domashevskaya Administrative Director: Dr. S.V. Ryabtsev http://www.vsu.ru/english/depts/research/labs/spectroscopy.html)
Mathematical Simulation of Complex Nonlinear Processes and Structures (Co-Director: Prof. V.V. Obukhovskiy http://www.vsu.ru/english/depts/research/labs/mathsim.html)
 Theoretical Physics (Director: Kopitin I.V. )
 Biodiversity and Ecosystems Monitoring
Conjugated Processes in Electrochemistry and Corrosion
Economics and Management
Ellipsometric Materials Research
Geodynamics and Seismic Monitoring Academic
Geology and Minerals
History of Archaeological Research and Records in Eurasia
Institute of Geology, Mineralogy and Geo-Chemistry of Russian Academy of Sciences, Voronezh Branch ( Director: Prof. Nikolay M. Chernyshov )
Ion Exchange and Chromatography
Photostimulated Processes in Crystals (Co-Director: Prof. Anatoly N. Latyshev )
Physics and Chemistry of Nanoscale Structured Systems ( Co-Director: Prof. Irina Ya. Mittova )
Systematics and Ecology of Insects ( Co-Director: Prof. Oleg P. Negrobov )

research institutes 

Chemistry and Pharmacy
Geology
Mathematics (Director: Prof. Victor G. Zvyagin)
Physics
Social Sciences

Alumni
 Svitlana Bilyayeva, archaeologist
 Anna Bogomazova, Russian kickboxer, professional wrestler and valet
 Pavel Cherenkov, a Nobel Prize in Physics winner
 Mark Krasnosel'skii, Soviet mathematician
 Lev Pavlovich Rapoport Soviet (Russian) theoretician physicist
 Ali Mohamed Shein, 7th President of Zanzibar

See also 
 List of modern universities in Europe (1801–1945)

References

External links
Voronezh State University homepage
Word University Ratings

Voronezh State University
Buildings and structures in Voronezh Oblast
Educational institutions established in 1918
1918 establishments in Russia